Cheung Chak Chuen (born September 22, 1957) is a Hong Kong sprint canoer who competed in the mid 1980s. He was eliminated in the repechages of the K-4 1000 m event at the 1984 Summer Olympics in Los Angeles.

External links
Sports-Reference.com profile

1957 births
Canoeists at the 1984 Summer Olympics
Hong Kong male canoeists
Living people
Olympic canoeists of Hong Kong